Daryl Roth (born December 21, 1944) is a Tony Award-winning theatre producer who has produced over 90 productions on and off Broadway. Most often serving as a co-producer or investor, Roth has also been a lead producer of Broadway shows such as Kinky Boots, Indecent, Sylvia, It Shoulda Been You, and The Normal Heart.

Roth frequently cites that she holds "the singular distinction of producing seven Pulitzer Prize-winning plays." She was a lead producer of Nilo Cruz's Anna in the Tropics, Margaret Edson's Wit, Paula Vogel's How I Learned to Drive, and Edward Albee's Three Tall Women. Roth was co-producer of Bruce Norris' Clybourne Park, Tracy Letts' August: Osage County, and David Auburn's Proof.

Personal life
Roth was born Daryl Atkins to a Jewish family; her father was a car dealer, and her mother was a homemaker. She was raised in Wayne, New Jersey.

Roth is married to Steven Roth, the billionaire real estate investor; Mr. Roth is a business partner and close confidant of former President Donald Trump. According to the New York Times, Ms. Roth "attended the Trump inauguration with her husband and has avoided publicly taking sides on the administration." In March 2019, President Trump appointed Ms. Roth to the board of trustees of the John F. Kennedy Center for the Performing Arts.

Daryl and Steven Roth have two children, including Jordan Roth, president of Jujamcyn Theaters.

Daryl Roth Theatre 
The former Union Square Savings Bank building was acquired by Roth in 1996 and has undergone renovation and additions in order to create three venues. The Daryl Roth Theatre, the DR2 Theatre and the cabaret bar: The D-Lounge.

Philanthropy and honorary awards 
Roth is a Member of the Mayor's Theater Subdistrict Council, an Honorary Trustee for Lincoln Center Theater, and served on the board of directors of the Albert Einstein College of Medicine and New York State Council on the Arts. She also is an appointed member of the New York City Police Foundation Board of Trustees.

Her other awards and honors include: The 2016 Order of the Golden Sphinx Award from The Hasty Pudding Institute of 1770;  The 2014 New York Living Landmarks award; The 2013 Einstein Humanitarian Award from The Women's Division and Albert Einstein College of Medicine; The 2013 Broadway Association Visionary Leader Award; The Stella Adler 2012 Harold Clurman Spirit Award; the 2012 Family Equality Council Hostetter-Habib Family Award; The 2011 Live Out Loud Humanitarian Award, 2010 Lucille Lortel Lifetime Achievement Award, Primary Stages 2007 Honoree, The National Foundation for Jewish Culture's Patron of the Arts Award, The Jewish Theological Seminary's Louis Marshall Award, The Albert Einstein College of Medicine Spirit of Achievement Award, The National Corporate Theatre Fund's Chairman Award, and The Tisch School of the Arts Award for Artistic Leadership. Roth has twice been included in Crain's “100 Most Influential Women in Business.”

The Daryl Roth Creative Spirit Award annually honors a gifted theatre artist or organization, providing them with financial support as they develop new works in an artistic residency.

Daryl Roth Gallery 
___

Broadway productions 

Roth's Broadway producing credits include:

Off-Broadway productions 
Roth's off-Broadway producing credits include:

Awards and nominations

Filmography 
Roth's film credits include:
 James Lapine's film Custody starring Viola Davis
 Albert Nobbs starring Glenn Close
 the Emmy-nominated HBO feature, Dinner with Friends, based on Donald Margulies’ Pulitzer Prize-winning play
 The Lady in Question, a documentary based on the career of Charles Busch
 A Very Serious Person written by Charles Busch, starring Polly Bergen
 Don't Ask, Don't Tell starring Marc Wolf
  My Dog: An Unconditional Love Story a documentary exploring the relationships of well-known New Yorkers and their dogs

References

External links
 
 Daryl Roth at Internet Off-Broadway Database

1944 births
American theatre directors
American film producers
20th-century American Jews
Place of birth missing (living people)
Living people
Roth family
People from Wayne, New Jersey
21st-century American Jews